Karim Asad Ahmad Khan  (born 30 March 1970) is a British lawyer specialising in international criminal law and international human rights law, who has served as Prosecutor of the International Criminal Court since 2021.

After his appointment by the Secretary-General of the United Nations, António Guterres, he served as United Nations Assistant Secretary-General and acted as Special Advisor and Head of the United Nations Investigative Team to promote Accountability for Crimes Committed by Daesh/ISIL in Iraq (UNITAD), which was established in accordance with Security Council resolution 2379 (2017) to support national efforts to hold ISIL (Daesh) accountable for acts that may amount to war crimes, genocide, and crimes against humanity in Iraq. 

On 12 February 2021, Khan was elected the chief prosecutor of the International Criminal Court (ICC).

Education and early career

Educated at Silcoates School, Khan earned an LLB degree and AKC from King's College London. He was called to the Bar of England and Wales by Lincoln's Inn in 1992. He later attended Wolfson College at Oxford University as a Doctoral candidate (D.Phil.)  in law, although he did not complete the course and does not hold a Doctorate. Between 1993 and 1996 Khan was a Crown Prosecutor at the Crown Prosecution Service of England and Wales, as well as a Senior Crown Prosecutor in 1995.

International law career

From 1997, Khan worked as a Legal Officer at the Office of the Prosecutor at the International Criminal Tribunal for the Former Yugoslavia (ICTY) between 1997 and 1998. He later served as Legal Adviser at the Office of the Prosecutor at the International Criminal Tribunal for Rwanda (ICTR) until 2000.

Between 2006 and 2007, Khan was lead defence counsel to former President of Liberia Charles Taylor before the Special Court for Sierra Leone (SCSL).

Khan spent several years engaged in leading cases at the International Criminal Court (ICC), International Criminal Tribunal for the former Yugoslavia, International Criminal Tribunal for Rwanda, Extraordinary Chambers in the Courts of Cambodia (ECCC), and the Special Tribunal for Lebanon (STL). In 2008, he was appointed Lead Counsel to former Le Monde journalist Florence Hartmann, who had served as chief spokesperson to ICTY and ICTR prosecutor Carla del Ponte, when she was charged with contempt of court. Between 2008 and 2010, he was engaged as Lead Counsel before the ICC representing Sudanese rebel leader Bahr Idriss Abu Garda, the first ICC suspect to voluntarily surrender to the jurisdiction of the Court. In January 2011, he was instructed as Lead Counsel to represent Francis Muthaura before the ICC in relation to the post-election violence in 2007–2008. He later served as Lead Counsel for Deputy President of Kenya William Ruto before the ICC, and Lead Counsel for Deputy Prime Minister of Kosovo Fatmir Limaj before the EULEX Court in Kosovo from 2014 until 2017. He also served as the Lead Counsel for Saif al-Islam Gaddafi and Baghdadi Mahmudi at the ICC.

Khan represented a group of Anglophone human rights lawyers charged with terrorism and other offences before the Military Court in Yaoundé, Cameroon, as international counsel from February 2017 until September 2017. He led the team that advised Cham and Albanian communities in relation to their expulsion from Greece, and subsequent expropriation of property after the Second World War. He was lead counsel for a large victims case in Sierra Leone arising out of the ECOMOG intervention in 1999–2002, and he represented more than 100,000 victim claimants from the Kipsigi and Talai communities in Kenya seeking redress for alleged human rights violations committed during the colonial period.

Until June 2021, Khan was based in Baghdad, Iraq, and served as Special Adviser and Head of the Investigative Team for the United Nations Investigative Team for the Promotion of Accountability for Crimes Committed by Da'esh/ISIL in Iraq (UNITAD), established pursuant to Security Council resolution 2379 (2017). Khan led the team in achieving its mandate in the collection, storage, and preservation of evidence related to crimes committed by Da'esh/ISIL; the promotion throughout the world of accountability for the crimes committed by Da'esh/ISIL; to work with survivors in recognition of their interest in the achievement of accountability for crimes to which they have been subjected; to respect the sovereignty of the Government  of Iraq in performing this investigation.

Khan met with government, religious, and community leadership across Iraq as part of his mandate at UNITAD.

In February 2021, Khan was elected chief prosecutor of the International Criminal Court on a nine-year term during the second round of voting, receiving votes from 72 out of 123 member states (62 needed). Khan was the third chief prosecutor elected in the ICC's history, and the first one elected by secret ballot. Khan had been nominated by the United Kingdom. He took office in June 2021, replacing Fatou Bensouda.

In April 2022, Khan said of the war in Ukraine: "We have reasonable grounds to believe that crimes within the jurisdiction of the court are being committed." Eleven months later, he successfully applied for two arrest warrants alleging Vladimir Putin and Maria Lvova-Belova violated two Rome Statute rules against systematic deportation, transfer and hostage-taking.

Other activities

Between 1996 and 1997, Khan was a member of the Law Commission of England and Wales. He is a life member of the Human Rights Institute, International Bar Association (IBA), and a founding director of the Peace and Justice Initiative, a Hague-based NGO focused on effective implementation of the Rome Statute of the International Criminal Court at national levels.

Khan served until 2018 as a member of the executive council and the victims committee of the International Criminal Court Bar Association, and he was the president of the ICCBA from June 2017 to June 2018. At the end of his tenure, Khan was appointed the first honorary president of the ICCBA. In July 2018, he was recognised as a worldwide ambassador of the African Bar Association.

Khan was appointed Queen's Counsel in 2011. He is a member of Temple Garden Chambers London.

Personal life

Khan’s father, a consultant dermatologist, was born in Mardan, British India (now Pakistan). His mother, a state registered nurse, was born in the UK. He has a sister and two brothers, one of whom is the former Conservative British MP Imran Ahmad Khan.

References

External links

1970 births
Living people
Lawyers from Edinburgh
International Criminal Court prosecutors
British prosecutors
Members of Lincoln's Inn
21st-century King's Counsel
English King's Counsel
British lawyers of Pakistani descent
British Ahmadis
People educated at Silcoates School
Alumni of King's College London
Associates of King's College London
20th-century British lawyers
21st-century British lawyers